Tinkers Island is a pair of small islands off the coast of Marblehead, Massachusetts, United States. It is only accessible by boat and houses several small camps. The island was named after the breed of mackerel that can be found close to its shores.

History 
During an April 1786 snowstorm, a Spanish ship carrying iron wrecked on Tinker's Island. Through history, the island has been variously rented out for ballast or for a boy's camp. Official ownership (for tax purposes) of Tinker's Island was unresolved for decades, then, in 1969, Salem, Massachusetts officially claimed the island for tax purposes.

References

External links
Tinkers Island on Google Maps
Tinker Island at Marblehead Magazine
Tinker's Island on Noblenet

Islands of Essex County, Massachusetts
Islands of Massachusetts
Marblehead, Massachusetts
Coastal islands of Massachusetts